Krishnappa may refer to

Bidaram Krishnappa, Carnatic musician
Kumara Krishnappa Nayak, was a ruler of the Madurai Nayak dynasty, India
Tubaki Krishnappa Nayak, an army commander in service of the Vijayanagar empire
B. Krishnappa, a Professor in India
Krishnappa Gowtham, Indian Cricketer
Budhi Kunderan, full name Budhisagar Krishnappa Kunderan an Indian Cricketer.
Anantharamu Krishnappa, Indian Writer and Publisher.
M. V. Krishnappa, Indian Politician.
M. Krishnappa (Born 1918), Indian Politician.
M. Krishnappa (Born 1953), Indian Politician.
M. Krishnappa (Born 1962), Indian Politician.

Indian masculine given names